The Central Collegiate Women's Hockey Association (CCWHA) is a non-profit ice hockey league for college club teams based at Midwestern United States schools. It was formed in October 1996. There are currently 14 teams participating in two divisions. All teams in the league are also required to be members of the ACHA that provides the teams with USA Hockey insurance and other member benefits.

The CCWHA was established with the goal of encouraging and improving opportunities in ice hockey for women; developing and encouraging sportsmanship among all players for the betterment of their physical and social well-being; and conducting an organized League wherein women enjoy recreational and competitive ice hockey. The CCWHA season runs from September to late February/early March with an annual tournament at the end of each season for each division. Winners of each division are awarded an automatic bid to the ACHA National tournament. All teams benefit by scheduling games against each other in the League and the recognition of the League at local and national levels.

Current members

Division I 

*Michigan State (D1) left the league in 2004 and rejoined at a later date.#Roosevelt acquired Robert Morris's women's hockey team.

Division II 

*MSU and Notre Dame both left the league (2006 and 2004 respectively) and returned when the 2nd division was formed in 2014. 

**Adrian College and Michigan State University both field a Division I and Division II team in the CCWHA and ACHA. Teams have separate coaching staffs and rosters.

Former members

CCWHA Championship History
The inaugural playoff, held at Michigan State University (Munn Ice Arena in East Lansing) in February of 1997 was the capstone of the 1996-97 CCWHA inaugural season. The eight teams that comprised the CCWHA that season included the following schools:  Ohio State University, University of Michigan, Michigan State, University of Illinois, University of Wisconsin, Western Michigan University, Lake Forest College and Bowling Green State University.

Division I

Division II

CCWHA Victors

National Championships
CCWHA Teams have combined to win eleven national championships, including ten of the seventeen ACHA Women's Division I national championships since the ACHA began sanctioning women's hockey in 2000-01.
 Miami (OH) - 2014, 2016, 2017
 Michigan State - 2003, 2011
 Lindenwood - 2008, 2009, 2010
 Robert Morris (IL) - 2005, 2007
 Western Michigan - 1997 (pre ACHA known as Women's Collegiate Club Championship)

World University Games Selections

Since 2011, the American Collegiate Hockey Association has supplied players for the United States team at the World University Games women's hockey tournament, held biennially and as part of the multi-sport event for college and university student-athletes. Miami's 11 player selections (through 2017) lead the conference and are tied for the national lead, and RedHawks coach Scott Hicks has also been picked as an assistant coach on two separate occasions. Michigan State ranks next with eight player selections, although the Spartans hold the top spot in a couple key distinctions: MSU is one of just two schools nationally to have at least one player on each WUG team since 2011, and is also tied for the national lead with eight unique players who have traveled to the tournament, as none of MSU's eight picks are repeat selections.

References

External links
 Official Website
 ACHA Women's DI

ACHA Division 1 conferences
3
Sports in the Midwestern United States
